Ketapang is a district in South Lampung Regency, Lampung, Indonesia. The district consists of 20 villages, and majority are of the Javanese ethnic.

Village in Ketapang Sub-District 
 Ketapang
 Legundi
 Bangun Rejo
 Tri Dharma Yoga
 Sri Pendowo
 Karang Sari
 Sumber Nadi
 Pematang Pasir
 Ruguk
 Gunung Taman
 Sumur Induk
 Yogaloka
 Kramat Bakau
 Berundung
 Taman Sari
 Lebung Nala
 Kemukus
 Sidoasih
 Sidoluhur
 Way Sidomukti

Districts of Lampung